Kronberg (Taunus) Süd station is a railway station in the municipality of Kronberg im Taunus, located in the Hochtaunuskreis in Hesse, Germany.

References

Rhine-Main S-Bahn stations
Railway stations in Hesse
Buildings and structures in Hochtaunuskreis